Linda Kelly may refer to:

* Linda L. Kelly (born 1949), Attorney General of Pennsylvania
 Linda Kelly (author) (1936–2019), English historian